The genus Eutimesius has four species described, is diagnosed by the cephalotorax with one enlarged eminence ; dorsal scute with white spots; area III with two spines; and the penis with distal U-shaped cleft, ventral plate narrow and long at base; stylus with dorsal process and the basal half of the glans membranous (Pinto-da-Rocha, 1997)

Species

Eutimesius albicinctus (Roewer, 1915) - Mérida, VENEZUELA.
Eutimesius ephippiatus (Roewer, 1915) - Quindina-Linia?, COLOMBIA.
Eutimesius ornatus (Roewer, 1943) - Bogotá, Cundinamarca, COLOMBIA; Táchira, VENEZUELA.
Eutimesius simoni Roewer, 1913 - Loreto, PERU; Guainia, COLOMBIA; Napo, Los Ríos, ECUADOR; Amazonas BRAZIL.

Harvestmen